Machet die Tore weit (German for: Make the gates wide) is a motet for Advent by Andreas Hammerschmidt. He set verses from Psalm 24 in German for six unaccompanied voices, concluded by an extended "Osianna".

History and music 
Hammerschmidt set composed the motet, setting verses 7–10 from Psalm 24 in German, in the translation of the Bible by Martin Luther, in English beginning: "Lift up your heads, O ye gates; and be ye lift up, ye everlasting doors; and the King of glory shall come in. Who is this King of glory? The LORD strong and mighty, the LORD mighty in battle.". The motet is scored for six vocal parts,  SSATBB.

In a middle section, the questions and answers are given to two subchoirs, the high voices (SST) asking, the low voices (ABB) answering. The text of verse 7 appears again, and the work is concluded by a fugel setting of the acclamation "Osianna", quoting .

The motet is frequently included in collections for Advent and Christmas, typically as the title piece.

References

External links 
 

Advent music
Motets
1736 compositions